Marinko Mačkić (born March 28, 1983) is a Bosnian-Herzegovinian football manager and former player. He usually played as a defender and he made his career in Serbia, Bosnia and Herzegovina and Iran.

Club career
Born in Banja Luka, SR Bosnia and Herzegovina, Marinko began playing in FK Sloboda Novi Grad, before moving to Serbia to join the youth teams of FK Partizan. He also played in the youth team of FK Čukarički. He signed his first professional contract when he was 16, and he made his senior debut in 2000 when he joined FK Mladost Lučani playing in the Second League of FR Yugoslavia. In his first season there, they got promoted and played the 2001–02 season in the First League of FR Yugoslavia. However, their top-flight season did not end well, and Mladost ended the season relegated back to the Second League.

In the winter break of the 2002–03 season, Marinko Mačkić moved to the top-flight club FK Vojvodina, but did not have many chances to play in the first team, so he ended up returning to Bosnia, playing on loan with his home-town club, FK Borac Banja Luka, now in the newly created Premier League of Bosnia and Herzegovina.

In summer 2005 his loan deal ended, and he joined another Bosnian Premier League side, FK Sarajevo playing with them in the following one and a half seasons being coached by Husref Musemić. In the winter break of the 2006–07 season he moved to Iran by joining Saba Battery.

Because of health reasons he had to retire sooner than expected and became a coach. He first coached FK Sloboda Novi Grad and then became the coach of the youth team of Slovenian side ND Slovan.

International career
He has played for Bosnia and Herzegovina national under-21 football team on ten occasions, and was also called to play for the Bosnian national team in 2008 but failed to debut.

Honours
FK Sarajevo
Premier League of Bosnia and Herzegovina 2006–07

Personal life
After seeing his career unexpectedly interrupted, Mačkić graduated at the Faculty of Sports in Sarajevo, and also obtained a UEFA coaching license.

He is married to Vesna and has a son named Damjan.

References

External links
 

1983 births
Living people
Sportspeople from Banja Luka
Association football defenders
Bosnia and Herzegovina footballers
FK Mladost Lučani players
FK Vojvodina players
FK Borac Banja Luka players
FK Sarajevo players
Saba players
First League of Serbia and Montenegro players
Bosnia and Herzegovina expatriate footballers
Expatriate footballers in Serbia and Montenegro
Bosnia and Herzegovina expatriate sportspeople in Serbia and Montenegro
Expatriate footballers in Iran
Bosnia and Herzegovina expatriate sportspeople in Iran
Bosnia and Herzegovina football managers